Elena Forbes is an English writer of crime fiction.  The protagonist of her novels so far is Detective Inspector Mark Tartaglia of the Barnes Murder Squad. Her first novel was shortlisted for the John Creasey (New Blood) Dagger Award.

Biography
Elena Forbes was born and brought up in London. After studying Modern Languages (French and Italian) at Bristol University, she worked in portfolio management before becoming a full-time writer. Forbes lives in Notting Hill, London with her husband and two children.

Novels

Mark Tartaglia
 Die With Me (2007)
 Our Lady of Pain (2008)
 Evil in Return (2010)
 Jigsaw Man (2015)

Eve West
 A Bad, Bad Thing (2018)

External links
 Official Website the official website of author Elena Forbes.
 The Darker Side an essay by Elena Forbes.
 Reviews of Die With Me and Our Lady of Pain
 Interview with Elena Forbes

Year of birth missing (living people)
Living people
English crime fiction writers
People from Notting Hill
Alumni of the University of Bristol
English women novelists
Women mystery writers